Osai Ojigho (born 1976) is a Nigerian human rights expert, lawyer and gender equality advocate, who  is the Director of Amnesty International's national office in Nigeria. She serves on the Global Advisory Council of the Institute for African Women in Law (IAWL) and sits on the board of Alliances for Africa.

Early life and education 
Ojigho was born in Lagos State to the family of Chief Mark Obu and his wife Theresa. She obtained her (LLB) law degree at University of Lagos and a Master of Laws (LLM) degree from the University of Wolverhampton, United Kingdom. She was called to the Nigerian Bar in 2000 and obtained a practice Diploma in International Human Rights from the College of Law of England and Wales in 2010.

Career 
In 2017, Ojigho was appointed Country Director of Amnesty International in Nigeria, where she has overseen and participated in advocacy and social change campaigns including the Bring Back Our Girls and End SARS movement as well as lending the organisation's voice to various for human rights violations, social injustice, housing rights, and gender based sexual violence.

Awards 
In 2015, Ojigho  was listed by the African Feminist Forum as one of 18 phenomenal African feminists to know and celebrate.

References 

1976 births
Living people
Nigerian women lawyers
Lawyers from Lagos
Nigerian human rights activists
Nigerian feminists
University of Lagos alumni
Alumni of the University of Wolverhampton